Hedley was a Canadian pop rock group that originated in Abbotsford, British Columbia, originally formed in 2003. They were named after the unincorporated community of Hedley, British Columbia, a name chosen after members heard that it was for sale for $346,000. After lead singer Jacob Hoggard placed third on the second season of Canadian Idol in 2004, the group signed with Universal Music Canada and released their self-titled debut studio album the following year. After signing an international recording contract with Capitol Records in 2006, which brought them an increased American following. Hedley saw commercial success with their subsequent studio albums, including Famous Last Words (2007), The Show Must Go (2009), Storms (2011), Wild Life (2013),  Hello (2015) and Cageless (2017).

Following the release of their seventh studio album Cageless (2017) and its accompanying tour, current members of Hedley faced accusations of sexual misconduct with young women over the course of their career. After Hoggard faced additional accusations of sexual assault by two women, the group confirmed they would enter an indefinite hiatus.

History

2003–2008
Hedley originally consisted of  Jacob Hoggard, Kevin Giesbrecht, Kevin Heeres, Ryan Federau, and Brandon McKay. Hoggard got into Canadian Idol, where he made it to the top three. Shortly after, the members decided to go their separate ways, but the band re-formed not long after, with Hoggard as the only original member.

Their debut single "On My Own" reached number 1 on the Canadian Singles Chart and the follow-up "Trip" peaked at number 11. The singles "On My Own", "321", "Trip", and "Gunnin" topped the MuchMusic Countdown.  Their last single, "Street Fight", off of their self-titled debut album was successful on both the MuchMusic Countdown and the Canadian Singles Chart. Their first single from their album Famous Last Words, "She's So Sorry", achieved much success on the MuchMusic Countdown as it reached number 1.

In 2005 the band went on their first tour across Canada, with The Weekend and Faber (the band currently known as Faber Drive). Then went on a 19-city Canadian tour with Simple Plan and in early 2006, headlining The Get Some Tour cross Canada club tour with MxPx and Faber.

In the summer of 2006, they signed a record deal for the United States with Capitol Records. At the time a division of EMI, Universal Music Group competitor, before being sold in the fold of EMI in 2012 to Universal. Upon signing Hedley's self-titled album was released with a new cover in the US on September 26, 2006, a year after its initial release in Canada. During June 2006, the band went on tour in the US, opening for fellow Capitol Records artist, Yellowcard, with Matchbox Romance. Subsequently, Hedley was dropped by Capitol Records in 2007.

Hedley released their second album, Famous Last Words, on October 30, 2007. It went platinum ten days after release.  The first single from the CD, "She's So Sorry", was released to radio on August 21, 2007. The video was shot in Toronto, Ontario, and premiered on MuchMusic on September 20, 2007.

In late 2007, the band was chosen to open for Bon Jovi on their Lost Highway Tour at their Canadian stops for 14 shows  which forced them to postpone their own tour until early 2008, opened by State of Shock.

Famous Last Words was released on May 12, 2009 in the US with a blue cover and new name "Never Too Late". 5 songs replaced with 5 from the band's first album. Dropped by Capitol Records in 2007, Never Too Late was released by Fontana Distribution, at the time owned by Hedley's Canadian record label's parent company Universal Music.

2009–2011: The Show Must Go and Go with the Show
On November 17, 2009, Hedley released their third studio album The Show Must Go. The first single "Cha-Ching" peaked at number 6 in the Canadian Hot 100. The second single, Don't Talk to Strangers peaked at number 11 on the Canadian Hot 100, and at number 1 on the Much Music Countdown. The third single "Perfect" peaked at number seven in the Canadian Hot 100, and also peaked at number one in the Much Music Countdown.  The fourth single off the album was "Hands Up".

The band went on The Show Must Go... on the Road Tour across 38 cities in Canada in support of the new album The Show Must Go. On November 16, 2009, Chart Attack reported, "Fefe Dobson and Stereos will be along for the whole trek, while Faber Drive and Boys Like Girls will support on select dates." A live album and documentary entitled Go With the Show was recorded during this tour. Released on CD/DVD on November 9. 2010.

In 2010 the band signed an American record deal with Island Records, owned by same mega-label, Universal Music Group, as Hedley's Canadian label. The album was originally to be released in the US on October 12, but instead was released on December 7, 2010, containing the bonus tracks "I Do (Wanna Love You)" (a re-arrangement of the song "For the Nights I Can't Remember") and "Color Outside The Lines". The band also toured the US to promote the album.

The band performed Cha-Ching in a segment with other artists highlighting Canadian music at the closing ceremony of the Vancouver 2010 Winter Olympic Games. The song was later included in the soundtrack to the closing ceremonies Sounds of Vancouver 2010: Closing Ceremony Commemorative Album.

2011–2013: Storms
On May 5, 2011, Hedley confirmed that they were back in the studio recording a new album. The first official single from the album, entitled, "Invincible", was released on iTunes (Canada) on August 23, 2011. The single has yet to be released on iTunes in the US. An official music video for the song was released on September 6, 2011.

The band's fourth studio album, Storms, was released on November 8, 2011. This album consists of 12 tracks (17 on the deluxe edition). A music video was released for the album's second single "One Life" on December 14, 2011.

The album sees the group experimenting with elements of pop and rock music to create their most musically diverse soundscape yet, as well as the one with most overt pop overtones. Debuting at number two on the Canadian Albums Chart (edged out only by Michael Bublé's Christmas), it is also Hedley's most successful album thus far. The album debuted at number two on the Canadian Albums Chart, selling 23,000 copies. This was the biggest debut of the week, behind Michael Bublé's holiday album Christmas. This album marks the band's highest album chart peak. On November 23, 2011, the album was certified gold by Music Canada. Hedley won the Juno Award for Best Pop Album at the 2012 awards. The album produced two top-20 singles, "Invincible" (featuring rapper P. Reign on the single release) and "One Life". The album included the track "Beautiful" which was first released on Hedley's live album Go With the Show in 2010.

After the success of Storms, Hedley released a new single called "Kiss You Inside Out" on May 18, 2012, included in the re-release of Storms on June 5, 2012. A  French version of Kiss You Inside Out featuring additional vocals by Andrée-Anne Leclerc was also made available on iTunes. Kiss You Inside Out was met with critical acclaim and netted the band their highest chart peak to date.

To promote Storms, the band went on the 31 city Shipwrecked tour during early 2012.

2013–2015: Wild Life
On August 27, 2013, "Anything", the first single released. Followed by the video posted on September 10, 2013. The album, entitled 'Wild Life,'  released on November 11, 2013 in Canada. Consisting of 11 tracks (15 on the deluxe version).

Hedley signed in late 2013  again with Capitol Records, now owned by Universal Music Group, the same mega-label owner of as their Canadian label. The album was released via Capitol Records in the US on May 20, 2014. The album's second single "Crazy For You", released October 22, 2013 and video released February 14, 2014. The band's album, 'Wild Life,' was released in the US on May 19, 2014.

Hedley headlined the 101st Grey Cup Halftime show at Mosaic Stadium at Taylor Field in Regina, Saskatchewan on November 24, 2013. Performing a 13-minute compilation of Hands Up, Anything, Invincible and Cha-Ching.

Hedley went on a Canadian national headlining tour, Wild Live Tour, to promote the album, in February–April 2014, playing 37 cities and ending in hometown, Abbotsford, British Columbia. As well as The Studio at Webster Hall in New York on January 14 and Los Angeles at The Sayers Club on January 16.

2015–2018: Hello, departure of Chris Crippin, Cageless and hiatus
On September 8, Hedley released "Lost in Translation" as the lead single off the album Hello. The sixth album was released via Universal Music Canada on November 6, 2015.

Hedley have been nominated for Group of the Year for the 2016 Juno Awards but lost to Walk Off the Earth. On July 3, 2016, they were the headliners of the post-Queen's Plate concert held at Woodbine Racetrack (in Toronto) which also featured The Strumbellas & The Mathew Good Band.

On March 31, 2017, Hedley announced on their Facebook page that their drummer, Chris Crippin had left the band after 11 years.

On July 21, 2017, Hedley announced their album Cageless, which was released September 29, 2017.

Hedley announced February 28, 2018, via Twitter, that the band would be on an "indefinite" hiatus. The band's last performance was in Kelowna, British Columbia on March 23, 2018.

Convictions
On February 13, 2018, then current Hedley members were anonymously accused of sexual misconduct with young fans, primarily female, as young as 14 years of age. As a result, the Juno Awards and the band mutually agreed to cancel their scheduled performance. The band posted a Facebook message, saying that the accusations were unsubstantiated and that while the band in the past "engaged in a lifestyle that incorporated certain rock and roll clichés [...] there was always a line that we would never cross". On February 28, 2018, Hedley announced that they would take an indefinite hiatus following their tour. That same day, Hoggard announced he would be taking an indefinite step back from his career.

The response received mixed reviews from critics, fans, and victims of assault alike with the hashtag #outhedley2k18 on Twitter. On February 16, 2018, it was announced that Hedley was dropped by their management team effective immediately; supporting acts Shawn Hook and Neon Dreams quit from the band's Cageless Tour (on which the band remained as the only headliners). Several radio stations and media organizations (including Bell Media Radio, Corus Radio and CBC Music) removed and suspended all of their music due to these allegations.

On February 25, 2018, an Ottawa woman accused lead singer Jacob Hoggard of sexual assault after the pair met on Tinder and went to a hotel to have sex in November 2016. Attorneys for Hoggard denied the allegations in a statement sent to CBC News on his behalf. On March 16, 2018, the Toronto Police Service Sex Crimes Unit confirmed that it has opened an investigation into Hoggard. On July 23, 2018, Hoggard was charged with one count of Sexual Interference and two counts of Sexual Assault Causing Bodily Harm. On June 5, 2022, Hoggard was convicted of sexually assaulting the Ottawa woman.

On November 8, 2018, former drummer of the band Chris Crippin spoke out against Hoggard's behaviour during his time with the band. Crippin stated he was routinely called a "faggot" and was told to "shut the fuck up" when he tried to speak out. In a separate interview in July 2019, Crippin said that Hoggard was "extremely rude" and it wasn't behaviour he wanted to be around.

On October 20, 2022, Hedley frontman Jacob Hoggard was sentenced to 5 years in prison after being found guilty of sexually assaulting an Ottawa woman.

Band members
Final line-up
Jacob Hoggard – lead vocals, guitar, piano (2003–2018)
Dave Rosin – guitar, backing vocals (2005–2018) 
Tommy Mac – bass, backing vocals (2005–2018)
Jay Benison – drums (2017–2018)Former Members' Ryan Federau – guitar (2003-2005)
 Kevin Giesbrecht – guitar (2003-2005)
 Kevin Heeres – bass (2003-2005)
 Brandon McKay – drums (2003-2005)
 Chris Crippin  – drums (2005-2017)

DiscographyHedley (September 6, 2005 Canada, September 26, 2006 US)Famous Last Words/Never Too Late (October 30, 2007 Canada, May 12, 2009 US)The Show Must Go (November 17, 2009 Canada, December 7, 2010 US, April 16, 2010 Worldwide)Storms (November 8, 2011) Wild Life (November 11, 2013 Canada, May 20, 2014 US)Hello (November 6, 2015)Cageless'' (September 29, 2017 Canada, October 6, 2017 US)

Tours

Headlining
Hedley (2005)
On the Road (2006)
The Show Must Go (2009–2010)
Shipwrecked Tour (2012)
Wild Live (2014–2015)
Hello World Tour (2016)
Cageless Tour (2017–2018)

Opening act
Still Not Getting Any (2005)
Lost Highway Tour (2007)
All the Right Reasons Tour (2007)

Awards and nominations

Canadian Radio Music Awards

Juno Awards

Garth Richardson was nominated for Producer of the Year at the Juno Awards of 2006 for producing "Gunnin" and "Villain" by Hedley.
Brian Howes won Producer of the Year at the Juno Awards of 2007 for producing "Trip" by Hedley.
Brian Howes was nominated for Producer of the Year at the Juno Awards of 2011 for producing "Cha-Ching" and "Perfect" by Hedley.
Brian Howes won Producer of the Year at the Juno Awards of 2012 for producing "Heaven's Gonna Wait" by Hedley.
Brian Howes and Jacob Hoggard were nominated for Producer of the Year at the Juno Awards of 2014 for producing "Anything" and "Crazy for You" by Hedley.

iHeartRadio Much Music Video Awards

SOCAN Awards

See also
List of bands from Canada

References

Capitol Records artists
Canadian pop punk groups
Musical groups established in 2003
Musical groups from British Columbia
Universal Music Group artists
2003 establishments in British Columbia
Musical groups disestablished in 2018
Juno Award for Pop Album of the Year winners